Olivia Catherine Hack (born June 16, 1983) is an American actress, best known for providing the voice of Rhonda Wellington Lloyd in Nickelodeon's Hey Arnold!, and for playing Cindy Brady in the 1990s theatrical Brady Bunch films. She has also done voice work for Fillmore!, Bratz as Cloe, Family Guy, Blood+ and Avatar: The Last Airbender as Ty Lee. She appeared in Star Trek Generations, Party of Five and Gilmore Girls.

As a child actress, Hack appeared in her first commercial spot when she was eight months old.

Entertainment Weekly noted the authenticity of Hack's reprisal of Cindy in the 1990s Brady Bunch films, and the New York Daily News made positive comparisons of Hack's work to that of Susan Olsen's Cindy from the original television series.

In both 2000 and 2001, Hack received Young Artist Awards nominations for 'Best Performance in a Voice-Over: TV/Film/Video'  for her work in the series Hey Arnold!.

Filmography

Live-action television
 Phenom (1 episode, 1993) as Jennifer
 Wings (1 episode, 1995) as Cindy Brady
 Nick Freno: Licensed Teacher (1 episode, 1997) as Lorrie
 Perversions of Science (1 episode, 1997) as Jenna Sorensen
 Touched by an Angel (1 episode, 1997) as Kim
 Tracey Takes On... (2 episodes, 1998) as Bethany
 Party of Five (2 episodes, 1998) as Stephanie
 Two of a Kind (1 episode, 1999) as Tammy
 The David Cassidy Story (2000) as Young English Fan
 Freaks and Geeks (1 episode, 2000) as Erin
 Sammy (2000) as Lola
 Any Day Now (22 episodes, 2001–2002) as Young Mary Elizabeth O'Brien
 Judging Amy (1 episode, 2002) as Jasmine Barnes
 Gilmore Girls (8 episodes, 2003–2004) as Tanna Schrick
 Cold Case (1 episode, 2005) as Tiffany - 1965

Live-action film
 Star Trek Generations (1994) as Olivia Picard
 The Brady Bunch Movie (1995) as Cindy Brady
 A Very Brady Sequel (1996) as Cindy Brady
 Crayola Kids Adventures: 20,000 Leagues Under the Sea (1997) as Captain

Voice artist

Film
 Napoleon (1995) as Nancy
 The Emperor's New Groove (2000) as Little Girl
 Hey Arnold!: The Movie (2002) as Rhonda Wellington Lloyd
 Open Season 2 (2008) as Charlene
 Bratz: Rock Angelz (2005) as Cloe
 Scooby-Doo! Abracadabra-Doo (2010) as Treena
 Hey Arnold!: The Jungle Movie (2017) as Rhonda Wellington Lloyd

Animation
 P. J. Sparkles (1992) as Glowee
 Life with Louie (1 episode, 1995) as Kelly Bassett
 Rocket Power (1 episode, 2000) as Lizzie
 As Told by Ginger (1 episode, 2000) as Hall Monitor
 The Kids from Room 402 (13 episodes, 2000–2001) as Gabrielle
 Rugrats (2001) as Emica
 All Grown Up! (2001, 2003, and 2007) as Emica
 Fillmore! (1 episode, 2003) as Trace
 Astro Boy (2 episodes, 2003–2004) as Various
 Hey Arnold! (42 episodes, 1996–2004) as Rhonda Wellington Lloyd
 Family Guy (4 episodes, 1999–2005) as Various
 Bratz (23 episodes, 2005–2006) as Cloe
 Blood+ (50 episodes, 2005–2006) as Mao, Irene
 Avatar: The Last Airbender (12 episodes, 2006–2008) as Ty Lee
 Psi-Kix (2008) as Various
 Ben 10: Ultimate Alien (1 episode, 2011) as Emily
 Care Bears: Welcome to Care-a-Lot (3 episodes, 2012) as Kaylee, Best Friend Bear, Baby Hugs Bear, and Sweet Dreams Bear
 Star Wars: The Clone Wars (2012) as Katooni
 Care Bears & Cousins (2015 - 2016) as Lotsa Heart Elephant
 Star Wars Forces of Destiny (2018) as Qi'ra
 Burn the Witch as Ninny Spangcole

Video games
 Final Fantasy X-2 (2003) as Hana
 Xenosaga Episode II (2005) as Shion Uzuki
 Bratz: Rock Angelz (2005) as Cloe
 Avatar: The Last Airbender (2006) as Ty Lee
 Avatar: The Last Airbender – The Burning Earth (2007) as Ty Lee
 Avatar: The Last Airbender – Into the Inferno (2008) as Ty Lee
 Eat Lead: The Return of Matt Hazard (2009) as QA, Evil QA
 The Sims Medieval (2011) as Sim
 Lightning Returns: Final Fantasy XIII (2013) as Additional Voices
 Epic Seven (2018) as Silk, Armin, Purin
 Persona 5 Royal (2020) as Jose
 Bratz: Flaunt Your Fashion (2022) as Cloe

References

External links 
 

1983 births
Living people
American child actresses
American film actresses
American television actresses
American video game actresses
American voice actresses
20th-century American actresses
21st-century American actresses